Bunte Blätter (English: Colorful Leaves), Op. 99, is a collection of piano pieces by Robert Schumann assembled from earlier unpublished pieces after the success of the Album for the Young (Album für die Jugend), Op. 68. Upon publication the pieces were issued both as a complete set and individual pieces, the latter in differently colored covers.

History

Robert Schumann started work on assembling the collection of pieces that were eventually published as the Bunte Blätter Op. 99 and Albumblätter Op. 124 in late 1850. His original plan was to publish the pieces as a single collection entitled Spreu (English: Chaff). When the music publisher F. W. Arnold objected to the proposed title, Schumann decided to split the collection.

All of the pieces used, were works that Schumann had composed in the past and had either not intended for publication, or had been rejected for publication with earlier sets of pieces. Ernst Herttrich in his preface to the Henle score, comments that the specific criteria the composer used to select the pieces included in either this collection or the succeeding one are unknown, though the pieces are organised loosely from least to most difficult. Dates of composition range from 1834  to 1849 .

Many writers have pointed out that several of the pieces had personal associations for the author, for example, the first piece in the collection, was a Christmas greeting the composer had composed for his wife Clara in 1838.

Movements

References 
Notes

Sources

External links
 
 , performed by Sviatoslav Richter
 , performed by Sviatoslav Richter
 , piano soloist: Grigory Sokolov
 , piano soloist: Martin Stedtfelt

1848 compositions
1849 compositions
Piano music by Robert Schumann
Compositions for solo piano